John Robert Stobo Prichard,  (born 1949) is a Canadian lawyer, economist, and academic. He is the past president and chief executive officer and former director of Torstar Corporation. He is now the chairman of the Bank of Montreal.

Academia
Born in London, England, Prichard attended prep school at Upper Canada College before studying economics at Swarthmore College, business at the University of Chicago, and law at the University of Toronto and Yale Law School.

Prichard joined the Faculty of Law at the University of Toronto in 1976. He served as dean of the faculty from 1984 to 1990.

Prichard was appointed the thirteenth president of the University of Toronto in 1990, a position which he held until 2000. During his ten years as president, the U of T's endowment rose to $1.4 billion, the most of any Canadian university.

Toronto Star
Upon leaving the University of Toronto, Prichard became the president of the Star Media Group and chief operating officer of the Torstar Corporation in May 2001. In 2004, Prichard pushed out John Honderich as publisher of the Toronto Star because he resisted making the deep cost cuts that Prichard demanded. However, in 2006, Honderich, a Torstar director who chairs a voting trust comprising five families that control Torstar, instigated a "coup" among the five families that resulted in the termination of Prichard's chosen publisher Michael Goldbloom and editor-in-chief Giles Gherson.  Some have suggested that Torstar's financial woes have been caused by Prichard's distraction by his presence on several boards, including Onex and Four Seasons.

Prichard has also been a member of Imasco's board of directors since 1993. Imasco owns and controls Imperial Tobacco, the largest tobacco manufacturer in Canada. Prichard's involvement with Imasco was the subject of criticism, due to a perceived conflict of interest for his role as university head. During Prichard's term as president, the University of Toronto accepted $2 million from Imasco between 1997 and 1999. In 1998, Imasco contributed just over $2.5 million to educational institutions across the country. Similar conflict of interest concerns have been raised about the 2005 deal engineered by Prichard by which Torstar acquired a 20 per cent stake in broadcaster and rival publisher Bell Globemedia Inc.

Political work
Prichard served on the transition teams of three Ontario premiers of three different parties: Liberal David Peterson in 1985, New Democrat Bob Rae in 1990, and Progressive Conservative Mike Harris in 1995.

Prichard was deemed by several political insiders to be a contender in the race to become Liberal Party Leader, following the resignation of former Prime Minister Paul Martin.

Business career
Prichard is past president and chief executive officer and former director of Torstar Corporation, and also sits on the boards of George Weston Limited, Onex Corporation, and is the chairman of the board of the Bank of Montreal.

Current work
Prichard is the chair of the board of Metrolinx and Penguin Group Canada, as well as the chair of Toronto law firm Torys LLP.

References

External links
Order of Canada Citation
 

1949 births
Living people
Canadian economists
Lawyers in Ontario
Canadian legal scholars
Canadian university and college faculty deans
Directors of Bank of Montreal
Directors of George Weston Limited
English emigrants to Canada
Deans of law schools in Canada
Officers of the Order of Canada
Members of the Order of Ontario
Presidents of the University of Toronto
Academic staff of the University of Toronto Faculty of Law
Yale Law School alumni
Swarthmore College alumni
Upper Canada College alumni
University of Chicago alumni
University of Toronto Faculty of Law alumni
Canadian chief executives
Torstar people
Directors of Onex Corporation
Chief operating officers